

The Arado SD III was a fighter biplane developed in Germany in the 1920s. It was developed in parallel with the SD II and shared most of that aircraft's airframe design. The main differences were connected with the powerplant installation, which in turn required a shorter forward fuselage and redesigned undercarriage. Evaluated at Staaken, Rechlin and finally at Lipetsk, it was judged unsuitable for mass production, but the lessons learned from it proved invaluable to Arado in designing the Ar 64 and Ar 65.

Specifications

See also

References

 
 World Aircraft Information Files. Brightstar Publishing, London. File 889 Sheet 74
 German Aircraft  between 1919 - 1945

Biplanes
Single-engined tractor aircraft
1920s German fighter aircraft
SD III